Zophopetes quaternata, the western palm nightfighter, is a butterfly in the family Hesperiidae. It is found in Senegal, the Gambia, Guinea, Ivory Coast and Ghana.

The larvae feed on Phoenix reclinata.

References

Butterflies described in 1876
Erionotini
Butterflies of Africa
Taxa named by Paul Mabille